Belitung (Belitung Malay: Belitong, formerly Billiton) is an island on the east coast of Sumatra, Indonesia in the Java Sea. Administratively, it forms two regencies (Belitung Regency and East Belitung Regency) within the province of Bangka-Belitung Islands. The island is known for its pepper and for its tin. It was in the possession of the United Kingdom from 1812 until Britain ceded control of the island to the Netherlands in the Anglo-Dutch Treaty of 1824. Its main town is Tanjung Pandan. The United Nations Educational, Scientific and Cultural Organization has declared 17 tourist attractions in the Belitung Geopark as world geoparks.

Demography
The population was 262,357 at the 2010 Census and 309,097 at the 2020 Census. The population is centred in several small towns; the largest are Tanjung Pandan in the west and Manggar in the east, which are the respective capitals of the two Regencies (Belitung and Belitung Timur) into which the island is administratively divided.  While ethnic Bangka Malays people make up the largest percentage along with Chinese people, Belitung has significant populations of Bugis, Sundanese, and Javanese people who formerly worked for the Dutch, mining tin.  There is also a small population of Madurese who were settled there in the Suharto era transmigration.

Religion
Before the arrival of Dutch missionaries, the island's inhabitants and most of the Indonesian archipelago had already converted from Hinduism, Buddhism, and Animism to Islam due to the work of Chinese Muslim traders. As a result, Christian churches were unable to gain considerable numbers of followers.
Today, Belitung is a religiously diverse island. Sunni Islam is the most widely practised religion, with sizeable minorities of Buddhists, Christians and Confucianists.

Transportation

On Belitung island, the only airport is in Belitung Regency; that is, the H.A.S. Hanandjoeddin International Airport maintains a series of connecting flights to Pangkal Pinang Airport, as well as a plane to Soekarno-Hatta International Airport. International flights via Singapore's Changi International Airport are through Garuda Indonesia airlines.

Flag carrier Garuda Indonesia has four direct flights from Singapore. The Singapore-Tanjung Pandan direct flight operates four times weekly - departing at 5:20 pm on Mondays, Wednesdays and Fridays, and 5:30 pm on Sundays.

Belitung Island has four ports; three in Belitung Regency and one in East Belitung Regency, serving cargo ships and ferry ships.

Online taxi services (such as Gojek and Grab) are available, as well as standard taxicabs, the taxi bandara (airport taxi) and commonly-hailed street taxis.

Geography

Belitung is a medium-sized island (at about ), also encompassing smaller adjacent islands, of which Mendanau Island to the west is the largest. Belitung consists of moderately-rugged terrain, and several hills. The maritime boundaries of the province include Bangka Strait to the west, Karimata Strait to the east, Natuna Sea to the north, and the Java Sea to the south. The Gaspar Strait runs north-south (between the islands of Bangka and Belitung), connecting the Java Sea to the Natuna Sea and, further north, the South China Sea. Its surrounding turquoise blue seas are moderately calm and shallow, making for great sailing, snorkeling and swimming. Belitung is popular for its abstract granite boulders and brilliant, white-sand beaches in Tanjung Tinggi, Tanjung Kelayang, Tanjung Binga and Lengkuas island.

Economy

Belitung is a source of tin, clay, iron ore and silica sands. The Dutch mining company NV Billiton Maatschappij derives its name from the island's name. Billiton merged with BHP in 2001 to form BHP Billiton.

The island is also a producer of fishery products, pepper, coconut, and palm oil. People work as farmers, fishermen and miners. The island is easily accessible with eight daily 1-hour flights from Jakarta and 2 daily flights, with duration of 30 minutes and 50 minutes each, from Pangkal Pinang.

The white sand beaches and offshore islands are helping tourism to become a larger part of the economy.

Tourist destinations
The main tourist destinations are beaches and offshore islands/islets. The beaches are Tanjung Tinggi Beach and Tanjung Kelayang Beach, both of which have clear blue water, sand, and rocky beaches. The islands/islets are Batu Berlayar Island, which is mostly granite, Pasir Island, which is a tidal island made of sand (= pasir in Indonesian language), Bird Islet (Pulau Burong, which one can access from Tanjung Binga beach by walking at low tide, Lengkuas Island, which is the home of a 129-year-old lighthouse and a good place for snorkeling, and Babi Island and Kelayang Islet.

See also

 Belitung shipwreck
 Indonesia AirAsia Flight 8501

References

External links
 
Tempat Wisata DI Belitung
Pantai Tanjung Tinggi

Landforms of the Bangka Belitung Islands
Islands of Sumatra
Populated places in Indonesia